Clearwater Wilderness is a  wilderness area in the North Cascades mountain range, in northern Washington state, of the Northwestern United States. It is located in the Mount Baker-Snoqualmie National Forest, southeast of Tacoma in northeastern Pierce County.

It was created by Congress in 1984, under the 1964 Wilderness Act that established the National Wilderness Preservation System. Its southern border reaches Mount Rainier National Park, affording views of Mount Rainier from its trails.

Description
Below are the headwaters of the north-flowing Clearwater River, and many streams. Eight small lakes, including Summit Lake, are within the wilderness area.

Old-growth forests of Douglas fir, western hemlock and western redcedar are protected, and are reachable by hiking trails. The forest understory is made up mostly of ferns and mosses.

The season between October and May receives 90 percent of the area's annual precipitation. Snow in amounts reaching  can remain as late as July in high areas.

Wildlife in the area includes bears, deer, marmots, elk, cougars and pikas, as well as birds like eagles, grouse and songbirds.

Trails
 Summit Lake Trail is an easy  hike up  to Summit Lake. Mount Rainier can be seen from a high point near the lake.
 Clearwater Trail is a difficult  hike over the Clearwater River and a number of creeks, and through old growth and meadows.

Gallery

References

External links
 
 Clearwater Wilderness on the United States Forest Service website
 Clearwater Wilderness on Wilderness.net
 Clearwater Wilderness Trail Guides - Map
 

Wilderness areas of Washington (state)
Mount Baker-Snoqualmie National Forest
North Cascades of Washington (state)
Old-growth forests
Protected areas of Pierce County, Washington
Protected areas established in 1984
1984 establishments in Washington (state)